The great iora (Aegithina lafresnayei) is a species of bird in the family Aegithinidae. It is found in Cambodia, China, Laos, Malaysia, Myanmar, Thailand, and Vietnam. Its natural habitat is subtropical or tropical moist lowland forest.

References

great iora
Birds of Southeast Asia
great iora
Taxonomy articles created by Polbot